Manuel Pérez Flores (born 22 January 1980) is a Mexican retired footballer who played as a midfielder.

Career
He is known as El Tripa to team mates and fans alike. He began playing in the Primera División with Club Atlas in the 2001–02 season until his move in 2007 to Rayados de Monterrey in 2007. Pérez was known for his great passing abilities and his outstanding mid-range shots.
On 28 February 2007, under manager Hugo Sánchez, Pérez made his debut for the Mexico national football team in a friendly match against Venezuela in San Diego, California.

International appearances 
As of 28 February 2007

External links
 
 
 
 
 

1980 births
Living people
Mexican footballers
Mexico international footballers
Atlas F.C. footballers
C.F. Monterrey players
Indios de Ciudad Juárez footballers
Liga MX players
Footballers from Guadalajara, Jalisco
Association football midfielders